Modern Pirates is a 1928 German silent comedy film directed by Manfred Noa and starring Jack Trevor, Marietta Millner, and Sig Arno.

The film's sets were designed by the art director Alexander Ferenczy.

Cast

References

Bibliography

External links

1928 films
1920s adventure comedy films
German adventure comedy films
Films of the Weimar Republic
German silent feature films
Films directed by Manfred Noa
Seafaring films
Films set in Oceania
German black-and-white films
1928 comedy films
Silent adventure comedy films
1920s German films
1920s German-language films